Johannes Henricus Bernardus Kemperman (July 16, 1924 – June 13, 2011) was a Dutch mathematician. He taught at the University of Rochester for 25 years, and also worked at Purdue University and Rutgers University for ten years, each.

Born in Amsterdam, he received his education from the University of Amsterdam.

Selected publications

References

External links 
 

1924 births
2011 deaths
Dutch mathematicians
University of Amsterdam alumni
Purdue University faculty
University of Rochester faculty
Rutgers University faculty
Dutch expatriates in the United States
Scientists from Amsterdam